Dodiopsis solanikovi is a moth in the family Geometridae first described by Povilas Ivinskis and Aidas Saldaitis in 2001. It can be found near the Uryngym-gol River in Mongolia.

References

Gnophini
Moths described in 2001